Highland High School (HHS) is an accredited comprehensive public high school located in the town of Highland, Arkansas, United States, located south of Hardy. The school provides secondary education for students in grades 8 through 12. It is one of two public high schools in Sharp County, Arkansas and the sole high school administered by the Highland School District.

Academics 
Established in August 1964 with its first graduating class in May 1965, Highland High School is accredited by the Arkansas Department of Education (ADE) and has been accredited by AdvancED since 1975. The assumed course of study follows the Smart Core curriculum developed by the ADE. Students complete regular (core and elective) and career focus coursework and exams and may take Advanced Placement (AP) courses and exams with the opportunity to receive college credit.

Extracurricular activities 
The Highland High School mascot and athletic emblem is the Rebel with red and gray serving as the school colors. Significant efforts toward changing the mascot, which is perceived by many to carry racist connotations, have been largely unsuccessful. Though the school has recently removed most representations of the confederate flag and the playing of the song "Dixie" at sporting events, the Rebel mascot, adopted in the wake of desegregation and the Civil Rights Movement, remains despite considerable public sentiment from within and beyond the local community that it should be discontinued.

Athletics 
The Highland Rebels compete in interscholastic activities within the 4A Classification via the 4A Region 3 Conference, as administered by the Arkansas Activities Association. The Rebels participate in football, bowling (boys/girls), golf (boys/girls), basketball (boys/girls), cheer, competitive cheer, baseball, softball, and track and field (boys/girls).

Football games are played at the school's Rebel Memorial Stadium.

References

External links 
 

1964 establishments in Arkansas
Educational institutions established in 1964
Public high schools in Arkansas
Schools in Sharp County, Arkansas